Theophilea cylindricollis is a species of beetle in the family Cerambycidae. It was described by Pic in 1895.

References

Agapanthiini
Beetles described in 1895